Zinc finger protein 687 is a zinc finger protein that, in humans, is encoded by the ZNF687 gene.

References

Further reading